The 2008 Individual Speedway European Championship

Jurica Pavlič from Croatia is the defending European champion.

Calendar

Allocation

Qualifying rounds

Semi-finals

Final 
Final
2008-08-24 (1:30 pm)
 Lendava
Referee:  Frank Ziegler
Jury President: 
(11) Christian Hefenbrock was replaced by J. Franc
(15) Maksims Bogdanovs was replaced by M. Carpanese

References 
pzm.pl - UEM Calendar 2008
pzm.pl - Allocation

See also 

2008
European Individual